Darsham railway station is on the East Suffolk Line in the east of England, serving the villages of Darsham and Yoxford, Suffolk, lying midway between the two communities. Its three-letter station code is DSM.

It is managed by Abellio Greater Anglia, which also operates all trains that call.

The station-house is owned by Darsham Country Centre, a subsidiary of the Woodcraft Folk, and is run as a residential centre for youth groups.

Services
 the typical Monday-Saturday off-peak service at Darsham is as follows:

On Sundays frequency reduces to one train every two hours in each direction. Trains direct to and from London Liverpool Street were withdrawn in 2010.

References

External links 

National Rail Site for Darsham Station
The Darsham Country Centre Official Website
Darsham to Ipswich Live Departure Boards
Ipswich to Darsham Live Departure Boards

Railway stations in Suffolk
DfT Category F2 stations
Former Great Eastern Railway stations
Greater Anglia franchise railway stations
Railway stations in Great Britain opened in 1859
The Woodcraft Folk